Malone Armory is a historic National Guard armory building located at Malone in Franklin County, New York. It is a brick and stone castle-like structure built in 1892, designed to be reminiscent of medieval military structures in Europe. It was designed by State Architect Isaac G. Perry. It consists of a 2-story, steeply pitched hipped roofed administration building with an attached -story, gable-roofed drill shed.  The building is built of Potsdam sandstone and features a -story round tower on the administration building.

It was listed on the National Register of Historic Places in 1995.

Gallery

References

Armories on the National Register of Historic Places in New York (state)
Government buildings completed in 1892
Buildings and structures in Franklin County, New York
National Register of Historic Places in Franklin County, New York